The women's rhythmic individual all-around gymnastics competition at the 2018 Commonwealth Games in Gold Coast, Australia was held from 11 to 12 April at the Coomera Indoor Sports Centre.

The team competition on 11 April, was also used as the qualifying competition for the individual-all around. 26 athletes participated with the top 16 advancing to the final. However, only two athletes per nation were allowed to progress.

Qualification
Results:

R1 = 1st reserve for finalR2 = 2nd reserve for finalR3 = 3rd reserve for finalR4 = 4th reserve for final

Final
Results:

References

Gymnastics at the 2018 Commonwealth Games
2018 in women's gymnastics